Sob Sister is a 1931 American romance film directed by Alfred Santell and written by Edwin J. Burke, and starring James Dunn, Linda Watkins, Minna Gombell, Howard Phillips, George E. Stone and Molly O'Day. It was released on October 25, 1931, by Fox Film Corporation.

Cast   
     
James Dunn as Garry Webster
Linda Watkins as Jane Ray
Minna Gombell as Vonnie
Howard Phillips as Ned Smith
George E. Stone as Johnnie the Sheik
Molly O'Day as Daisy
Edward Dillon as Pat
George Byron as Dutch
Lex Lindsay as Slim
Harold Waldridge as Johnny
Neal Burns as Freddie
Ernest Wood as Dave
Harry Beresford as Pa Stevens
Sarah Padden as Ma Stevens
Charles Middleton as City Editor Baker
George Chandler as Reporter

References

External links 
 

1931 films
1930s English-language films
Fox Film films
American romance films
1930s romance films
Films directed by Alfred Santell
American black-and-white films